Julodis albomaculata is a species of beetles belonging to the Buprestidae family. This species occurs in Southern Africa.

References
 Universal Biological Indexer
 Biolib
 S.M.V. Gussmann New species and subspecies of Julodis Eschscholtz (Coleoptera: Buprestidae) from southern Africa

Buprestidae
Beetles described in 1860